Pedro Herrera Camarero (Valladolid, 18 January 1909 - Buenos Aires, 28 October 1969) was a Spanish anarcho-syndicalist.

Biography
A railway worker and friend of Diego Abad de Santillán, in 1927 he settled in Barcelona, where he joined the CNT-FAI. Eventually he became one of the main leaders of the Federación Anarquista Ibérica (FAI). As a representative of the FAI, he signed the UGT-CNT-PSUC-FAI action unity pacts in Barcelona on 11 August 1936 and 22 October 1936. He was Minister of Health and Social Assistance of the Generalitat de Catalunya from 17 December 1936 to 3 April 1937 as a representative of the CNT. He supported the theses of Marià Rodríguez i Vázquez, until the latter chose to support the government of Juan Negrín in 1938. During the time of the Negrín government, Herrera Camarero led the critical current of the FAI against the collaborationism of the CNT with the government.

At the end of the Spanish Civil War, he went into exile in Perpignan, where he remained for a time confined to the concentration camps of Vernet and Djelfa. He was a member of the general council of the Spanish Libertarian Movement and in April 1947 he was elected general secretary of the CNT in exile. Around 1950 he went to Rio de Janeiro and then to Argentina, where he published books and the magazine Resurgir. Over the years he approached reformist positions and is said to have supported five-pointism but without abandoning the CNT.

Works
 La AIT (1946) with José Pérez Burgos

References

1909 births
1969 deaths
People from Valladolid
Spanish anarchists
Health ministers of Catalonia